The , signed as Route K1, is one of the tolled routes of the Shuto Expressway system serving the Greater Tokyo Area and is one of seven of the routes in the system serving Kanagawa Prefecture. Alongside the Haneda Route, it connects Tokyo's Inner Circular Route in central Tokyo to Yokohama.

Route description
Route K1 begins at the Haneda interchange in Ōta as a continuation south for the Haneda Route into Kanagawa Prefecture. From this northern terminus, it travels southwest out of Tokyo, crossing in to the eastern part of the city of Kawasaki in Kanagawa Prefecture. The largest junction along the Yokohane Route in Kawasaki is at Daishi Junction where the highway meets the Kawasaki Route at its western terminus. In Yokohama, the expressway intersects the Yokohama North Route, the Daikoku Route, National Route 15, the Mitsuzawa Route, and National Route 1. Route K1 meets its southern terminus at Ishikawachō Junction with the Kariba Route.

The speed limit along almost the entire length of the Yokohane Route is set at 60 km/h. The only exception is at the southern terminus of the route between Yokohama-kōen and Ishikawachō Junction where the limit is lowered to 50 km/h.

History
The first section of the Yokohane Route was opened to traffic on 19 July 1968 between the interchanges at Asada and Higashikanagawa. Later that year, on 28 November, the expressway was extended north to its current northern terminus at Haneda. Next it was extended south to Kinkō Junction on 7 August 1972. It was extended further to the south terminating at an interchange at Yokohama-kōen on 7 March 1978. The Yokohane Route was completed upon completion of its extension south to its southern terminus at Ishikawachō Junction on 2 February 1984. Work began in 2015 to replace the Daichi Bridge that carries that expressway over the Tama River after fatigue cracks were found throughout the old bridge. The replacement project is set to be completed in 2023.

Gallery

Junction list

See also

References

External links

K1
1968 establishments in Japan
Roads in Kanagawa Prefecture
Roads in Tokyo